James or Jim O'Shea may refer to:

James O'Shea, Gaelic footballer, active in the 1990s and 2000s
James O'Shea (association footballer) (born 1988), Irish association footballer
James O'Shea (sculptor) of O'Shea and Whelan